Chaman District is an administrative district of Balochistan Province, Pakistan. Chaman District was created after bifurcating Qila Abdullah District. Chaman District is also known as the 'Dry port' for China-Pakistan Economic Corridor (CPEC) projects.

Administrative divisions 
It contains the following Tehsils:

 Chaman City Tehsil
 Chaman Saddar Tehsil

Sardar Asghar Khan Ashezai, a member of Awami National Party, is the current MPA of Chaman District. Recently, Capt. (R) Juma Dad Mandokhail has been appointed as the first Deputy Commissioner of the district.

Demographics
At the time of the 2017 census the district had a population of 434,561, of which 229,749 were males and 204,811 females. Rural population was 311,355 (71.65%) while the urban population was 123,206 (28.35%). The literacy rate was 45.50% - the male literacy rate was 59.54% while the female literacy rate was 29.80%. 1,140 people in the district were from religious minorities. Pashto is the predominant language, spoken by 97.72% of the population.

See also 
 Divisions of Pakistan
 List of districts in Balochistan

References

Districts of Balochistan, Pakistan
Districts of Pakistan
Chaman District
Populated places in Balochistan, Pakistan